PC Tech Magazine is an online technology news website providing technology, reviews, interviews and ICT research coverage. It was founded by Albert Mucunguzi in 2010.

History 
PC Tech Magazine was founded by Albert Mucunguzi in June 2010 while still at campus at Makerere University. It is among one of the leading online news website providing technology coverage across Africa.

Early days 

In its early days, PC Tech Magazine published daily articles online and issued monthly magazines. The first magazine was published in February 2010 but it was until the end of 2013 that they stop issuing magazine and to-date have only focused on publishing daily articles online. The articles in the magazines were extracted from PC Tech Online's  daily news updates.

The magazines were circulated in Ghana, Kenya, Nigeria, Rwanda, South Africa, and Uganda.

Awards and recognition 

In 2011 PC Tech Magazine won the Young Achievers Award, in 2016 was named in the Top 10 websites in Uganda by Alexa.com. In 2016 and 2017 they were recongized by Huawei Technologies Uganda as the best online technology news website in Uganda at the same time awarding their journalist Olupot Nathan Ernest in both years. In 2021 got a recognition from The International Trade Council's GO Global Awards as a Top Placer in media.

Other initiatives 

PC Tech Educate, CTBus (The Academuc Journal on PC Tech), Digital Learning Africa (Online Resource Platform), PC Tech Directory, and PC Tech Jobs.

References

External links 
 
 

News websites
Digital media
African news websites